Dysoptus avittus is a species of moth in the family Arrhenophanidae. It is known only from the type locality in southern Brazil.

Adults are on wing in October (based on one record).

Etymology
The species name is derived from the Latin a (not, without), added to the male morphological structure vitta (ribbon, band), in reference to a principal apomorphy of this species, the absence of an extruded vesica or vitta (sensu Philpott, 1928).

External links
Family Arrhenophanidae

Dysoptus
Taxa named by Donald R. Davis (entomologist)
Moths described in 2003